The New York Coliseum is a defunct sports venue and auditorium in the West Farms section of the Bronx, New York City. The  auditorium was originally built for Philadelphia's 1926 Sesquicentennial Exposition, and transported in 1928 to Starlight Park at 177th Street and Devoe Avenue. As such, it was also referred to as Starlight Park Stadium.  

The 15,000-seat edifice was used for circuses, boxing, political rallies, opera, and midget auto racing.  The Coliseum hosted the defunct Eastern Hockey League's Bronx Tigers franchise for two  seasons, 1933–34, and 1937–38. In late 1939, it was the home of the New York Giants of the short-lived National Professional Indoor Baseball League.  

The United States Army controlled the building from 1942 through 1946, after which it was used by New York City Transit Authority buses as the Coliseum Depot. In 1995, the Transit Authority closed the depot, and reopened it in 2003 as the West Farms Bus Depot. Only two parts of the original facade of the building remain on the rebuilt depot.

References

External links
 1937 photograph of coliseum showing official name of New York Coliseum on roof

Former sports venues in New York City
Coliseum
Boxing venues in New York City
1928 establishments in New York City
Sports venues completed in 1928
Defunct basketball venues in the United States
Defunct indoor arenas in New York City
Defunct indoor ice hockey venues in the United States
Indoor ice hockey venues in New York City
Basketball venues in New York City
West Farms, Bronx
Relocated buildings and structures in New York City
Sesquicentennial Exposition